Fullersburg is a former village in Downers Grove Township and York Township, DuPage County, Illinois near the Cook County border.  Though never incorporated in its own name, the area is historically important to the development of Hinsdale and Oak Brook, Illinois.

The area was originally called Brush Hill and was claimed by Orente Grant when the Indian land in Illinois was ceded to the United States government in the 1833 Treaty of Chicago.  Benjamin Fuller, of Broome County, New York, arrived in 1835 with his parents Jacob and Candace Fuller and some other relatives, and settled at Ginger Creek at what later became Spring Road in Oak Brook.  Ben Fuller built a house in 1840 on what is now York Road.  (By 1985, this Fuller House had moved into the Fullersburg Woods Forest Preserve from its original location.)  By 1851, he owned most of the area, and in 1851 subdivided and platted; the name changed from Brush Hill to Fullersburg.

See also

 Graue Mill

Notes

References

Hinsdale, Illinois
Oak Brook, Illinois
Unincorporated communities in Cook County, Illinois
Unincorporated communities in DuPage County, Illinois
1851 establishments in Illinois
Unincorporated communities in Illinois